Kubinka is a town in Odintsovsky District of Moscow Oblast, Russia, located on the Setun River,  west of Moscow. Population: 


History
Kubinka, founded in the 15th century, may have been named after Prince , a prominent local land-owner who died in 1546. It grew in importance in the second half of the 19th century when the Moscow-Smolensk railway passed through the area. The military test-range for tanks opened in 1931 and the military airbase opened soon afterwards. In December 1941 the Red Army halted the Wehrmacht's  drive towards Moscow on the outskirts of Kubinka.

Kubinka gained town status in 2004.

Administrative and municipal status
Within the framework of administrative divisions, it is, together with twenty-three rural localities, incorporated within Odintsovsky District as the Town of Kubinka. As a municipal division, the Town of Kubinka is incorporated within Odintsovsky Municipal District as Kubinka Urban Settlement.

Transportation

Railway transport

A suburban line links the town to Moscow's Belorussky railway station (the station Kubinka I). The train ride takes approximately 75 minutes. In 2015 a new 10 km train line opened in Kubinka. It goes from Kubinka railway station to Patriot Park, through the station "Museum", located near Kubinka Tank Museum.
The railway station Kubinka II of the Greater Ring of the Moscow Railway is also in Kubinka.

Military
Kubinka was the location of the Soviet Union's tank proving grounds, and today is the home of the Kubinka Tank Museum. It is also the location of the MAPO aircraft Maintenance Factory #121 and the Kubinka air base. This base serves as a base for the 237th Centre for Display of Aviation Equipment, which consists of Swifts and Russian Knights, who took place in the aerobatic show during 2010 Moscow Victory Day Parade.

Culture
The completion of the Patriot theme park is planned for 2017; a preliminary opening of the so-called "military Disneyland" took place in June 2015 by Vladimir Putin. It is located south of the Minsk highway at the border with the neighbouring settlements Golitsyno and Kalininets in the east and complements the local tourist attractions Kubinka Aviation Museum and Kubinka Tank Museum. The tank museum is located near the city. One of its most notable exhibits is Panzerkampfwagen VIII Maus which is the only remaining example in the world. This museum is also home to some unique and experimental armoured vehicles.

Healthcare

Kubinka's main hospital is District hospital N°3.

References

Notes

Sources

This article incorporates material from the Russian Wikipedia

 
Cities and towns in Moscow Oblast
Odintsovsky District